Jesa Farm Dairy Limited, often referred to as Jesa Farm Dairy, is a dairy processing company in Uganda.

Location
The head office and factory of Jesa Farm Dairy is located along Old Port Bell Road, in the industrial area of Kampala, Uganda's capital and largest city. The coordinates of the company headquarters and factory are: 0°19'11.0"N, 32°35'58.0"E (Latitude:0.319724; Longitude:32.599448).

Overview
Jesa Farm Dairy is an indigenous Ugandan operation, a member of the Mulwana Group of Companies, which include a dairy farm, a plastics manufacturing company, a battery-manufacturing business, a horticultural farm and a real estate development company.

History
They stocked the firm with 550 Friesian cows and named it Jesa Mixed Farm Limited. In 1994, Jesa Farm Dairy Limited was formed to  produce "packed milk, butter, yoghurt and cream".

Ownership
Jesa Farm Dairy Limited is owned by the estate of its founder, the late James Mulwana (1936–2013).

Products
The factory manufactures products including fresh milk, ESL milk, yoghurt and cream.

See also
List of milk processing companies in Uganda
Dairy industry in Uganda

References

External links
 Opportunities and challenges in Uganda’s dairy industry

Dairy products companies of Uganda
1994 establishments in Uganda
Food and drink companies established in 1994